The Sanumá, also referred to as Sanema, Sanima Tsanuma, Guaika, Samatari, Samatali, Xamatari and Chirichano in the literature, are an indigenous people of Brazil and Venezuela. They are related to the Yanomami. They number about 1500 and live on both sides of the border. In Venezuela, they are found in the Caura River and Ventuari River basins where they live alongside the Ye'kuana. The Sanumá language is a Yanomam language.

Conflicts with miners
On 24 October 2006, their reserve in Venezuela was invaded by miners who destroyed some of their villages. In retaliation, the Venezuelan army killed 10 miners. This incident led to mass protests by non-Indians in Southern Venezuela.

Further reading
Bruce Parry,Tribe: Adventures in a Changing World (Michael Joseph Raped Ltd, 2007)
Amy Penfield, Predatory Economies: The Sanema and the Socialist State in Contemporary Amazonia  (University of Texas Press, 2023) 
Alcida Ramos, Sanuma Memories: Yanomami Ethnography in Times of Crisis  (University of Wisconsin Press, 1995)

External links
Indigenous Peoples of Brazil – Yanomami
BBC: Sanema Tribe

Ethnic groups in Brazil
Indigenous peoples in Brazil
Indigenous peoples in Venezuela